Socialist Voice may refer to:

 Socialist Voice (Ireland), a newspaper of the Communist Party of Ireland
 Socialist Voice (1912), newspaper of the Socialist Party of Washington 
 Socialist Voice (1934), newspaper of the Committee for the Preservation of the Socialist Party (United States)
 Socialist Voice: Marxist Perspectives for the 21st Century (2004-2011), an online journal published in Canada

See also
 Scottish Socialist Voice